Putnam may refer to:

People 
 Putnam (surname)

Places

Canada
 Putnam, Ontario, community in Thames Centre

United States
 Putnam, Alabama
 Putnam, Connecticut, a New England town
 Putnam (CDP), Connecticut, the main village in the town
 Putnam, Illinois
 Putnam, Kansas
 Putnam, New York
 Putnam, Oklahoma
 Putnam, Texas
 Putnam Lake, New York
 Putnam Valley, New York
 Putnam County (disambiguation)
 Putnam Township (disambiguation)

Other uses 
 Putnam Classification System in library organization
 William Lowell Putnam Mathematical Competition, or simply the Putnam Competition
 Putnam Cottage, historic site in Greenwich, Connecticut
 Putnam Division, portion of New York and Putnam Railroad routes
 Putnam Investments, American investment management firm 
 Putnam Magazine, regional lifestyle magazine that covers Putnam County, New York
 Putnam's Magazine, 19th and early 20th century monthly American publication
 Putnam model, cost-estimation method in software engineering
 Putnam Museum and IMAX Theater in Davenport, Iowa
 G. P. Putnam's Sons, at times called "Wiley and Putnam", "Putnam Press", "Putnam Penguin", American book publisher
 Putnam, the Iron Son of '76, American play (1844)

See also 
The 25th Annual Putnam County Spelling Bee, musical play 
 Putnam House (disambiguation), historical homes of the Putnam family
 Putnam Park (disambiguation), parks in the United States
 Putnam-Parker Block, historic block of buildings in Davenport, Iowa
 List of places named for Israel Putnam